The Prosa State Park, formerly the Parque dos Poderes, is an urban state park in the state of Mato Grosso do Sul, Brazil.
It protects a remnant of cerrado vegetation, and is home to a wildlife rehabilitation center.

Location

The Prosa State Park is within the urban perimeter of the municipality of Campo Grande, capital of the state of Mato Grosso do Sul.
It is surrounded by a buffer zone in which there are restrictions on land use.

History

The area that would become the park was defined as the Parque dos Poderes Ecological Reserve in 1981.
It was upgraded to become the Prosa State Park by decree 10.783/2002 of 21 May 2002.
Its objectives are to preserve samples of the one of the city's last remnants of cerrado ecosystems, flora and fauna, to protect the sources of the Córrego Prosa and the landscape and cultural heritage of the region, and to support scientific research, environmental education, recreation and tourism in contact with nature.
The Management Plan was published in December 2011.
In 2012 there were about 10,000 visitors.

Environment

The park provides an important refuge for wildlife, with many resident or migratory species of mammals, reptiles and birds. 
Mammals include the giant anteater (Myrmecophaga tridactyla), southern tamandua (Tamandua tetradactyla), nine-banded armadillo (Dasypus novemcinctus), big hairy armadillo  (Chaetophractus villosus), black-tufted marmoset (Callithrix penicillata), robust capuchin monkey, howler monkey (Bugio), crab-eating fox (Cerdocyon thous), coati, ferret, red brocket (Mazama americana), pampas deer (Ozotoceros bezoarticus), capybara (Hydrochoerus hydrochaeris), Azara's agouti (Dasyprocta azarae), paca, Erinaceidae, tapeti (Sylvilagus brasiliensis), gray four-eyed opossum (Philander opossum), common opossum (Didelphis marsupialis), white-eared opossum (Didelphis albiventris), Pallas's long-tongued bat (Glossophaga soricina) and fruit bat.

There are many species of birds including the rufescent tiger heron (Tigrisoma lineatum), and a variety of reptiles such as the Brazilian lancehead (Bothrops moojeni) and gold tegu (Tupinambis teguixim).

Visiting

The park is open for visits, which must be scheduled, between 8:00 and 17:00 on Tuesday to Saturday.
Visitors may see the park by walking along trails with an accredited guide.
The Wildlife Rehabilitation Center may only be visited on Tuesdays, Thursdays and Saturdays.
Visitors should wear long pants, use insect repellant and bring water.
Motor vehicles and bicycles are not allowed, and pets must not be brought into the park.
Visitors must not take plants or animals, climb trees, swim, hunt, fish, leave litter or cause any damage to the environment.
Research requires authorization from the Environment Institute of Mato Grosso do Sul (Imasul).

Notes

Sources

State parks of Brazil
Protected areas established in 2002
2002 establishments in Brazil
Protected areas of Mato Grosso do Sul